COVID-19 pandemic in Congo may refer to:

COVID-19 pandemic in the Democratic Republic of the Congo
COVID-19 pandemic in the Republic of the Congo